Scottian may refer to:

Something of or related to Scottish writer Walter Scott
An alumnus of Scott Christian College in Nagercoil, Tamil Nadu

See also
Nova Scotia, a Canadian province whose residents are referred to as Scotians
Scott Ian (born 1963), an American musician
Scott (disambiguation)
Scottish (disambiguation)